At least two ships of the French Navy have been named Tage:

 , a  launched in 1847 and broken up in 1896.
 , a protected cruiser launched in 1886 and struck in 1910.

French Navy ship names